Ravulapalem mandal is one of the 22 mandals in Konaseema district of Andhra Pradesh. As per census 2011, there are 11 villages in this mandal.

Demographics 
Ravulapalem Mandal has total population of 83,360 as per the Census 2011 out of which 41,862 are males while 41,498 are females. The average Sex Ratio of Ravulapalem Mandal is 991. The total literacy rate of Ravulapalem Mandal is 77%.

Towns and villages

Villages 
1. Devarapalle
2. Gopalapuram
3. Ithakota
4. Juthigapadu
5. Komaraju Lanka
6. Lakshmipolavaram
7. Mummidivarappadu
8. Podagatlapalle
9. Ravulapalem
10. Ubalanka
11. Vedireswaram
<ref>  12alamuru 13jonnda 14mulasthanam 14chopella 15chomudulanka 16madiki}}

See also 
List of mandals in Andhra Pradesh

References 

Mandals in Konaseema district
Mandals in Andhra Pradesh